Runa is a Celtic music group. They combine the traditional music of Ireland and Scotland with modern music such as folk and jazz. The band members are based in Philadelphia, Nashville, and Chicago - they come from Ireland, USA and Canada. Their influences include Mary Black, The Chieftains, U2, Solas, Karen Casey, Loreena McKennitt, Wolfstone, Nickel Creek, Sarah McLaughlin, Enya, Moya Brennan, Kate Rusby, Dervish, Gerry O'Beirne, Clannad, Natalie MacMaster, and Amos Lee.

Members

Discography
 Jealousy (2009)
 Stretched on your Grave (2011)
 Somewhere along the Road (2012)
 Current Affairs (2014)
 Ten: The Errant Night (2019)
 ''The Tide of Winter (2020)

Awards and honours
 They have won several awards in the Montgomery-Bucks Music Awards in 2009 and 2010, including Best Folk Band, Best Album and Best Female Vocalist.
 Irish Music Awards 2012: Top Group & Top Traditional Group 
 12th Annual Independent Music Awards : Best Traditional/World Song ("Amhrán Mhuighinse")
 14th Annual Independent Music Awards: Best Traditional/World Song ("The False Knight Upon the Road")

References

External links

Official site
www.runamusic.com

Link to video
The Holy Ground video 2013

Celtic music groups
American folk musical groups
Musical groups established in 2009